The Land of Sannikov is a Soviet 1974 adventure film about the fictional Sannikov Land loosely based on the 1924 novel of the same name by Vladimir Obruchev.

Plot 
The exiled settler Alexander Ilyin persuades the gold mine owner Trifon Perfilyev to sponsor the expedition dedicated to the search for "Sannikov Land", a legendary warm land behind the polar circle. Hoping that this land could be filled with gold, Perfilyev agrees. A few more daredevils volunteer for the mission. The finally gathered crew consists of Ilyin himself, officer Evgeniy Krestovskiy, Perfilyev's servant Ignatiy, who is given a task of killing every other crew member in case they really find any gold, and Gubin, a Katorga runaway and a former doctor.

After a long journey, they reach the volcanic land and meet the natives – a tribe of "Onkilon". However they soon find out that the volcano is cooling down quickly, and the legendary land is about to start to freeze so that its unique ecosystem is doomed. Gubin chooses to stay with the Onkilons so as to share his knowledge and help them through the disaster, Ignatiy is killed, Krestovskiy falls from a cliff, and Ilyin has to return alone. Exhausted, he is picked up in the wilderness by Yakut hunters. As they carry him to safety, he watches the migrating birds overhead flying to the Sannikov Land, still unaware of its demise.

Cast 
 Vladislav Dvorzhetsky as Ilyin
Oleg Dahl as Evgeniy Krestovskiy
Yuriy Nazarov as Gubin
Georgy Vitsin as Ignatiy
 Makhmud Esambayev as Shaman
 Nikolai Gritsenko as Trifon Stepanovich Perfilyev
 Alyona Chukhray 
 Gevork Chepchyan
 Pyotr Abasheyev
 Tursun Kuralyev
 Yekaterina Sambuyeva
 Nasira Mambetova	
 Sergei Polezhayev
 Aleksandr Susnin
 Nikolai Kryukov as naval officer

Soundtracks 
Film featured two highly popular songs, written by Aleksandr Zatsepin and Leonid Derbenyov and performed by Oleg Anofriyev. The first of them achieved near-cult status:
 "There's just a moment..." ("Est' tol'ko mig")
 "All has been" ("Vsyo bylo")

References

External links 

 Est tolko mig... (performed by Anatoliy Grabezhov, shanson singer, mp3, 4196k) in Maksim Moshkow's Music Library

1973 films
1973 in the Soviet Union
1970s science fiction adventure films
Films based on Russian novels
Films scored by Aleksandr Zatsepin
Films set in a fictional location
Films set in the Arctic
Films shot in Crimea
Lost world films
Mosfilm films
1970s Russian-language films
Soviet science fiction adventure films